This is a list of notable women associated with the Restoration Movement (also known as the American Restoration Movement or the Stone-Campbell Movement).

 Sarah Shepherd Andrews
 Clara Babcock
 Sarah Bostick
 Selina Huntington Bakewell Campbell
 Jennie Everton Clarke
 Sarah Crank
 Lillie Cypert
 Hettie Ewing
 Clara Hazelrigg
 Silena Holman
 Emma Larimore
 Marinda Lemert
 Jessie Pounds
 Jessie Trout

References

Restoration Movement
Restoration Movement
Women
Restoration Movement women